The Zilvermeercross is a cyclo-cross race that has been organized annually since 2014 in Mol, Belgium.

Winners

Men

Women

References

Cycle races in Belgium
Cyclo-cross races
Recurring sporting events established in 2014
2014 establishments in Belgium
Sport in Antwerp Province